The 2010–11 Iowa Hawkeyes women's basketball team represented the University of Iowa in the 2010–11 NCAA Division I women's basketball season. The Hawkeyes are a member of the Big Ten Conference and finished 21-7 (10-6) during regular season play. They were eliminated from the Big Ten Conference women's basketball tournament in the second round and were invited to play in the NCAA Women's Division I Basketball Championship.

Exhibition

Regular season

Schedule

Rankings by Week

Roster

Player stats

Postseason

Big Ten tournament
Iowa went into the 2011 Big Ten Conference women's basketball tournament with a 22-7 (10-6) record and was seeded 4th.

NCAA Basketball tournament
Iowa was invited to the 2011 NCAA Division I women's basketball tournament as a 6 seed in the Spokane division.

Awards and honors
Kachine Alexander
Ranked #2 shooting guard in the country by ESPN.com and Fanhouse.com
Lowe's Senior CLASS Award
Preseason all-Big Ten (unanimous pick by coaches)
MVP of Islander Tip-Off Tournament
MVP of KCRG-TV9 Hawkeye Challenge
Co-Big Ten Player of the Week (Nov. 22)
First player in Iowa history, and the fifth in Big Ten history, to record 1,000 career points, 800 career rebounds and 300 career assists
Selected to Big Ten all-Defensive team
First team all-Big Ten selection by both league coaches and media
Named to Mid-season Top 30 List  for the Naismith Award
Named to Top 20 Mid-season List for the Wooden Award
Named to the Women's Basketball Coaches Association (WBCA) all-Region team
Wade Trophy Watch List
AP All-America Honorable Mention

Team players drafted into the WNBA

See also
2010–11 Big Ten women's basketball season

References

External links
Official Site

Iowa Hawkeyes women's basketball seasons
Iowa
Iowa
Iowa Hawkeyes
Iowa Hawkeyes